East Gordon  is a locality in the suburb of Gordon, a suburb of Sydney, in the state of New South Wales, Australia. It is located 13 kilometres north-west of the Sydney Central Business District in the local government area of Ku-ring-gai Council.

Sydney's largest  flying fox colony is located in a ravine in East Gordon.

References

Sydney localities
Ku-ring-gai Council